Carol Mann (February 3, 1941 – May 20, 2018) was an American professional golfer. She became a member of the LPGA Tour in 1961 and won two major championships and 38 LPGA Tour events in all.  She is a member of the World Golf Hall of Fame.

Amateur career
Mann was born in Buffalo, New York and grew up in Baltimore, Maryland and Chicago, Illinois. She started playing golf at the age of 9. She won the Western Junior and the Chicago Junior in 1958, and the Chicago Women's Amateur in 1960. She attended the University of North Carolina at Greensboro.

Professional career
Mann turned pro in 1960 and joined the LPGA Tour in 1961. She won her first tournament in 1964 at the Women's Western Open, a major championship at the time. She would go on to win a total of 38 events on the LPGA Tour, including two major championships. She earned the LPGA Vare Trophy in 1968 for lowest scoring average and was the tour's leading money winner in 1969. She led the tour in wins three times, 1968 with ten (tied with Kathy Whitworth), 1969 with eight, and 1975 with four (tied with Sandra Haynie). She was the LPGA's president from 1973 to 1976. She was inducted into the World Golf Hall of Fame in 1977. Her final competitive appearance came in 1981.

Mann was a long-time student of golf instructor Manuel de la Torre. She received the "First Lady of Golf Award" from the PGA of America in 2008.

Mann died at her home in The Woodlands, Texas on May 20, 2018 at the age of 77.

Professional wins

LPGA Tour wins (38)

LPGA Tour playoff record (3–2)

Major championships

Wins (2)

Books
 American Association of University Women, (Towson, Maryland, Branch), "Baltimore County Women, 1930-1975", (Baltimore: The Sunpapers, 1976) [The book is a collection of profiles of forty Baltimore County women "who distinguished themselves" in diverse fields (including opera singer Rosa Ponselle and artist Jane Frank), compiled as part of a project celebrating the 1976 United States Bicentennial ] OCLC 7441013
 Jolee Edmondson, The woman golfer's catalogue (New York : Stein and Day, 1980)

See also
List of golfers with most LPGA Tour wins

References

External links

Golfweek article

American female golfers
UNC Greensboro Spartans women's golfers
LPGA Tour golfers
Winners of LPGA major golf championships
World Golf Hall of Fame inductees
Golfers from New York (state)
Golfers from Maryland
Women's Sports Foundation executives
Sportspeople from Buffalo, New York
Sportspeople from Baltimore
Golfers from Chicago
Golfers from Houston
1941 births
2018 deaths